Zale is a genus of moths in the family Erebidae erected by Jacob Hübner in 1818.

Description
Palpi with second joint reaching vertex of head, and short third joint. Antennae of male with short fasciculate (bundled) cilia. Metathorax with a slight tuft. Abdomen with prominent dorsal tufts. Tibia of male heavily hairy. Mid tibia spined. Larva with four pairs of abdominal prolegs, where the first two pairs aborted or rudimentary.

Species
 Zale aeruginosa Guenée, 1852 – green-dusted zale moth
 Zale bethunei J. B. Smith, 1908 – Bethune's zale moth
 Zale buchholzi McDunnough, 1943 – Buchholz's zale moth
 Zale calycantha J. E. Smith, 1797 – double-banded zale moth
 Zale chisosensis Blanchard & Franclemont, 1982
 Zale colorado J. B. Smith, 1908
 Zale confusa McDunnough, 1940
 Zale curema J. B. Smith, 1908 – black-eyed zale moth or northeastern pine zale moth
 Zale declarans Walker, 1858
 Zale duplicata Bethune, 1865 – pine false looper moth, banded similar-wing moth, or grey similar-wing moth
 Zale edusina Harvey, 1875
 Zale exhausta Guenée, 1852
 Zale fictilis Guenée, 1852
 Zale galbanata Morrison, 1876 – maple zale moth
 Zale helata J. B. Smith, 1908 – brown-spotted zale moth
 Zale horrida Hübner, 1818 – horrid zale moth
 Zale insuda J. B. Smith, 1908
 Zale intenta (Walker, [1858])
 Zale lunata Drury, 1773 – lunate zale moth
 Zale lunifera Hübner, 1818 – bold-based zale moth
 Zale meriata (Martyn, 1797)
 Zale metata J. B. Smith, 1908
 Zale metatoides McDunnough, 1943 – washed-out zale moth or jack pine false looper
 Zale minerea Guenée, 1852 – colorful zale moth
 Zale obliqua Guenée, 1952 – oblique zale moth
 Zale obsita (Guenée, 1852)
 Zale perculta Franclemont, 1964 – Okefenokee zale moth
 Zale peruncta (Guenée, 1852)
 Zale phaeocapna Franclemont, 1950
 Zale rubi H. Edwards, 1881
 Zale rubiata J. B. Smith, 1908
 Zale rufosa Hampson, 1913
 Zale sabena Schaus, 1901
 Zale smithi Haimbach, 1928
 Zale squamularis Drury, 1773 – gray-banded zale moth
 Zale strigimacula Guenée, 1852
 Zale submediana Strand, 1917– gray spring zale moth
 Zale termina Grote, 1883
 Zale undularis Drury, 1773 – black zale moth
 Zale unilineata Grote, 1876 – one-lined zale moth
 Zale viridans Guenée, 1852

References

 
 

Omopterini
Heteroneura genera